Wavelength is a 1967 Canadian-American short subject by experimental filmmaker and artist Michael Snow. Considered a landmark of avant-garde cinema, it was filmed over one week in December 1966 and edited in 1967, and is an example of what film theorist P. Adams Sitney describes as "structural film", calling Snow "the dean of structural filmmakers."

Wavelength is often listed as one of the greatest underground, art house and Canadian films ever made. It was named #85 in the 2001 Village Voice critics' list of the 100 Best Films of the 20th Century. The film has been designated and preserved as a masterwork by the Audio-Visual Preservation Trust of Canada. In a 1969 review of the film published in Artforum, Manny Farber describes Wavelength as "a singularly unpadded, uncomplicated, deadly realistic way to film three walls, a ceiling and a floor... it is probably the most rigorously composed movie in existence."

Synopsis
Wavelength consists of almost no action, and what action does occur is largely elided. If the film could be said to have a conventional plot, this would presumably refer to the four "character" scenes. Snow's intent was "a summation of my nervous system, religious inklings and aesthetic ideas". The 45-minute-long zoom–which nonetheless contains edits–that incorporates in its time frame four human events in the room, including a man's death and a woman calling emergency later on, is intended to be symbolic of his intent. In the first scene, a woman in a fur coat enters the room accompanied by two men carrying a bookshelf or cabinet. The woman instructs the men where to place this piece of furniture and they all leave. Later, the same woman returns with a female friend. They drink the beverages they have brought, and turn on the radio, which plays "Strawberry Fields Forever" by the Beatles. Long after they leave, what sounds like breaking glass is heard. At this point, a man (Hollis Frampton) enters and inexplicably, although in a way to indicate his death, collapses on the floor. Later on, the woman in the fur coat reappears and makes an emergency phone call, speaking, with strange calm, about the dead man in her apartment whom she has never seen before.

Around the end, one can hear what sound like police sirens, but could just as well be a part of the musical score, a distinct piece of minimalist music that pairs tones at random. These tones shift in frequency (and in "wavelength"), becoming higher-pitched as the camera further analyzes the space of the anonymous apartment. What begins as a view of the full apartment zooms (the zoom is not precisely continuous as the camera does change angle slightly, noticeably near the very end) and changes focus slowly across the forty-five minutes, only to stop and come into perfect focus on a photograph of the sea on the wall. The film ends with the camera going completely out of focus and fading to white, as the soundtrack finally raises to a pitch too high to be heard.

Cast
 Hollis Frampton
 Lyne Grossman
 Naoto Nakazawa
 Roswell Rudd
 Amy Taubin
 Joyce Wieland
 Amy Yadrin

Structure

According to P. Adams Sitney, the trend in American avant-garde cinema during the late 1940s and 1950s (such as the work of Maya Deren and Stan Brakhage) was towards "increased complexity". Since the mid-1960s, filmmakers such as Michael Snow, Hollis Frampton, Paul Sharits, Tony Conrad and Joyce Wieland produced works where simplicity was foregrounded. Sitney labeled this tendency "structural film." The four characteristics of structural film are "fixed camera position…the flicker effect, loop printing, and rephotography off the screen." Sitney describes Snow as the "dean of structural film-makers" who "utilizes the tension" of Wavelength'''s use of a "fixed-frame and…the flexibility of the fixed tripod". Where Sitney describes structural film as a "working process," Stephen Heath in Questions of Cinema finds Wavelength "seriously wanting" in that the "implied…narrative [makes Wavelength] in some ways a retrograde step in cinematic form". To Heath, the principal theme of Wavelength is the "question of the cinematic institution of the subject of film" rather than the apparatus of filmmaking itself.

In 2003, Snow released WVLNT (or Wavelength For Those Who Don't Have the Time), a shorter (1/3 of the original time) and significantly altered version by overlaying multiple forms of the original film upon itself.

Reception and legacy
The screening of Wavelength in 1967 was, according to filmmaker Jonas Mekas, "a landmark event in cinema." Considered a canonical avant-garde film along with Léger and Murphy's Ballet mecanique (1924), Buñuel and Dalí's Un chien andalou (1929),  Maya Deren's Meshes of the Afternoon (1943), Stan Brakhage's Mothlight (1963) and Kenneth Anger's Scorpio Rising (1964), Wavelength's 45-minute running time nevertheless contributes to a reputation for being a difficult work:

[G]iven the film's durational strategy, we feel every minute of the time it takes to traverse the space of the loft to get to the infinite space of the photograph of waves—and the fade to white—at the film's end. The film inspires as much boredom and frustration as intrigue and epiphany....

The film won the Grand Prix at the 1967 Knokke Experimental Film Festival, Knokke, Belgium. and in a 1968 Film Quarterly review, Jud Yalkut describes Wavelength as "at once one of the simplest and one of the most complex films ever conceived." In a 1968 L.A. Free Press review of the film, Gene Youngblood describes Wavelength as "without precedent in the purity of its confrontation with the essence of cinema: the relationships between illusion and fact, space and time, subject and object. It is the first post-Warhol, post-Minimal movie; one of the few films to engage those higher conceptual orders which occupy modern painting and sculpture. It has rightly been described as a triumph of contemplative cinema.'"

Wavelength ranked 102nd in the 2012 Sight & Sound critics' poll of the greatest films ever made, and also received three directors' votes.

Distribution
Canadian Filmmakers Distribution Centre
Art Metropole

See also
Minimalist film
Cinema of Canada

References

Bibliography
Cornwell, Regina. Snow Seen: The Films and Photographs of Michael Snow. Toronto: PMA Books, 1980. 
Elder, R. Bruce. Image and Identity: Reflections on Canadian Film and Culture. Waterloo, Ontario: Wilfrid Laurier University Press, 1989. 
Farber, Manny. Negative Space: Manny Farber on the Movies. London: Studio Vista, 1971. 
Heath, Stephen. Questions of Cinema. Bloomington: Indiana University Press, 1981. 
 Legge. Elizabeth. Michael Snow: Wavelength. Cambridge, MA: Afterall (One Work Series), 2009. 
Michelson, Annette. "About Snow." October Vol. 8 (Spring, 1979): 111-125.
Shedden, Jim (ed.) The Michael Snow Project: Presence and Absence (The Films of Michael Snow 1965-1991). Toronto: Alfred A. Knopf Canada, 1995. 
Sitney, P. Adams. Visionary Film: The American Avant-Garde 1943-1978. New York: Oxford University Press, 1979. 
Zryd, Michael. "Avant-Garde Films: Teaching Wavelength." Cinema Journal 47, Number 1 (Fall 2007): 109-112.

External links
 
 
 

1967 films
1960s avant-garde and experimental films
English-language Canadian films
Films directed by Michael Snow
Canadian avant-garde and experimental short films
American avant-garde and experimental films
1960s English-language films
1960s American films
1960s Canadian films